Louis "Chapa" Herrera (born May 3, 1996) is an American professional soccer player who plays as a midfielder for El Paso Locomotive in the USL Championship.

Career
Herrera was initially spotted in 2018 at a local soccer tournament by El Paso Locomotive coach Mark Lowry, who invited him to a private tryout. After impressing the club in said tryout, Herrera signed for the club ahead of their inaugural season. Herrera made his debut for the club on March 24, 2019, coming on as an 80th-minute substitute for Sebastián Contreras in a 2-2 draw with Rio Grande Valley. He scored his first goal for the club in July of that season in a 1-1 draw with OKC Energy FC. After making 28 league appearances for the club during his first season, Herrera was retained for the 2020 campaign. In February of that season, Herrera went on trial with MLS club Los Angeles FC. His contract was extended for a third season at the end of 2020.

References

External links
Chapa Herrera at El Paso Locomotive
 at El Paso Coyotes

1996 births
Living people
El Paso Locomotive FC players
USL Championship players
American soccer players
Association football midfielders
Soccer players from El Paso, Texas
Major Arena Soccer League players
El Paso Coyotes players